Gompholobium uncinatum, commonly known as red wedge pea, is a species of flowering plant in the family Fabaceae and is endemic to eastern Australia. It is a small, low-lying shrub with trifoliate leaves, the leaflets linear to narrow lance-shaped, and red, or orange-red and yellow-green, pea-like flowers.

Description

Taxonomy and naming
Gompholobium uncinatum was first formally described in 1837 by George Bentham from an unpublished description by Allan Cunningham. Bentham's description was published in Commentationes de Leguminosarum Generibus. The specific epithet (uncinatum) means "hooked".

Distribution and habitat
Red wedge pea grows in heathland and forest from south-east Queensland to the Blue Mountains in New South Wales.

References

uncinatum
Flora of New South Wales
Flora of Queensland
Plants described in 1837
Taxa named by George Bentham